In mathematics, the boustrophedon transform is a procedure which maps one sequence to another. The transformed sequence is computed by an "addition" operation, implemented as if filling a triangular array in a boustrophedon (zigzag- or serpentine-like) manner—as opposed to a "Raster Scan" sawtooth-like manner.

Definition

The boustrophedon transform is a numerical, sequence-generating transformation, which is determined by an "addition" operation.

The entirety of the transformation itself can be visualized (or imagined) as being constructed by filling-out the triangle as shown in Figure 1.

Boustrophedon Triangle 

To fill-out the numerical Isosceles triangle (Figure 1), you start with the input sequence, and place one value (from the input sequence) per row, using the boustrophedon scan (zigzag- or serpentine-like) approach.

The top vertex of the triangle will be the input value , equivalent to output value , and we number this top row as row 0.

The subsequent rows (going down to the base of the triangle) are numbered consecutively (from 0) as integers—let  denote the number of the row currently being filled. These rows are constructed according to the row number as follows:
 For all rows, numbered , there will be exactly  values in the row.
 If  is odd, then put the value  on the right-hand end of the row.
 Fill-out the interior of this row from right-to-left, where each value is the result of "addition" between the value to right and the value to the upper right.
 The output value  will be on the left-hand end of an odd row (where  is odd).
 If  is even, then put the input value  on the left-hand end of the row.
 Fill-out the interior of this row from left-to-right, where each value is the result of "addition" between the value to its left and the value to its upper left.
 The output value  will be on the right-hand end of an even row (where  is even).

Refer to the arrows in Figure 1 for a visual representation of these "addition" operations.

For a given, finite input-sequence: , of  values, there will be exactly  rows in the triangle, such that  is an integer in the range:  (exclusive).

Recurrence relation

A more formal definition uses a recurrence relation. Define the numbers  (with k ≥ n ≥ 0) by

.

Per this definition, note the following definitions for values outside the restrictions (from the relationship above) on  pairs:

Special Cases 
In the case a0 = 1, an = 0 (n > 0), the resulting triangle is called the Seidel–Entringer–Arnold Triangle and the numbers  are called Entringer numbers .

In this case the numbers in the transformed sequence bn are called the Euler up/down numbers. This is sequence A000111 on the On-Line Encyclopedia of Integer Sequences. These enumerate the number of alternating permutations on n letters and are related to the Euler numbers and the Bernoulli numbers.

Algebraic definition(s) 

Building from the geometric design of the boustrophedon transform, algebraic definitions of the relationship from input values to output values can be defined for different algebras ("numeric domains").

Euclidean (Real) values 

In the Euclidean Algebra for Real-valued scalars, the boustrophedon transformed Real-value  is related to the input value, as:

,

with the reverse relationship (input from output) defined as:

,

where  is the sequence of "up/down" numbers—also known as secant or tangent numbers.

The exponential generating function

The exponential generating function of a sequence (an) is defined by

The exponential generating function of the boustrophedon transform (bn) is related to that of the original sequence (an) by

The exponential generating function of the unit sequence is 1, so that of the up/down numbers is sec x + tan x.

References

 
 

Integer sequences
Triangles of numbers
Permutations
Transforms